The 2011–12 season was Sloboda Point Sevojno's second consecutive season in the Serbian SuperLiga. It was the first season Sloboda played on the renovated Užice City Stadium. Sloboda kicked off the season away against Jagodina on 13 August. The first home game, in the renovated stadium, was against the champions Partizan on 21 August. The club had been playing under the name FK Sloboda Point Sevojno, until the name Sloboda Užice was restored as the club's name on 13 October 2011.

Because the club started the season with the name FK Sloboda Point Sevojno the name change wasn't effective until the end of the 2011-12 season.

Since Red Star won the Serbian Cup the 4th placed team would achieve Europa League spot. Sloboda gathered their form and eventually found themselves fighting for Europa League. At the end of round 29, the table was: Vojvodina in third place with 49 points, Jagodina in fourth place with 48 points, Sloboda Point in fifth place with 48 points, Radnički 1923 in sixth place with 47 points. In the last round Vojvodina faced Red Star at home, Jagodina faced Novi Pazar at home, Sloboda faced OFK Beograd away, and Radnički faced Rad away. Sloboda got the lead against OFK Beograd through Bojan Beljić in the 11th minute. At the 89th minute mark Sloboda was 4th, Vojvodina 5th. In the dying seconds of the match between Vojvodina and Red Star, Aboubakar Oumarou scored the winner for Vojvodina in a match which ended 2-1. That meant that Sloboda had the same number of points as 4th place Jagodina. However, because of a better head to head score (1-1 at Jagodina and 2-1 win for Jagodina in Užice), Jagodina achieved Europe.

Transfers

In

Out

Fixtures

Round

Results and positions by round

Serbian SuperLiga

Pld = Matches played; W = Matches won; D = Matches drawn; L = Matches lost; GF = Goals for; GA = Goals against; GD = Goal difference; Pts = Points

Serbian Cup

Round

Squad statistics

References

FK Sloboda Užice
Sloboda Point Sevojno